Manikpur Junction railway station is a railway station in Manikpur town of Chitrakoot district, Uttar Pradesh on Allahabad–Jabalpur section. It has 4 platforms. Passenger and Superfast trains halt here.

Major trains

 Yesvantpur–Lucknow Express (via Vijayawada)
 Bundelkhand Express
 Durg–Nautanwa Express (via Sultanpur)
 Durg–Nautanwa Express (via Varanasi)
 Saket Express
 Hubballi–Varanasi Weekly Express
 Yesvantpur–Lucknow Express (via Kacheguda)
 Udhna–Danapur Express
 Pune–Gorakhpur Express
 Barauni–Gondia Express
 Surat–Bhagalpur Express
 Tapti Ganga Express
 Lokmanya Tilak Terminus–Darbhanga Pawan Express
 Kashi Express
 Tulsi Express
 Rewa–Anand Vihar Superfast Express
 Faizabad Superfast Express
 Chambal Express
 Howrah–Mathura Chambal Express
 Sarnath Express
 Shipra Express
 Rajendra Nagar–Lokmanya Tilak Terminus Janta Express
 Chitrakootdham (Karwi)–Kanpur Intercity Express (via Allahabad)
 Gaya–Chennai Egmore Weekly Superfast Express
 Kamayani Express
 Imperial Indian Mail
 Lokmanya Tilak Terminus–Varanasi Express
 Ahmedabad–Allahabad Weekly Superfast Express
 Lokmanya Tilak Terminus–Gorakhpur Express
 Uttar Pradesh Sampark Kranti Express
 Mahanagari Express
 Ahmedabad–Patna Weekly Express

References 

Railway junction stations in Uttar Pradesh
Railway stations in Chitrakoot district
Allahabad railway division